Poropuntius cogginii is a species of ray-finned fish in the genus Poropuntius. It is endemic to Lake Erhai in Dali, Yunnan.

References 

cogginii
Endemic fauna of Yunnan
Freshwater fish of China
Fish described in 1911